Takydromus haughtonianus, commonly known as the Goalpara grass lizard, is a species of lizard in the family Lacertidae. The species is endemic to India.

Geographic range
T. haughtonianus is found in northeastern India in the Indian state of Assam.

The type locality is "Goalpara, Assam".

Reproduction
T. haughtonianus is oviparous.

References

Further reading
Günther A (1888). "On a collection of reptiles from China". Ann. Mag. Nat. Hist., Sixth Series 1: 165-172.
Jerdon TC (1870). "Notes on Indian Herpetology". Proc. Asiatic Soc. Bengal 1870: 66-85. (Tachydromus haughtonianus, new species, p. 72).
Lin, Si-Min; Chen, Chaolun Allen; Lue, Kuang-Yang (2002). "Molecular Phylogeny and Biogeography of the Grass Lizards Genus Takydromus (Reptilia: Lacertidae) of East Asia". Molecular Phylogenetics and Evolution 22: 276-288. [erratum in 26: 333].
Schlüter, Uwe (2003). Die Langschwanzeidechsen der Gattung Takydromus. Rheinstetten: Kirschner & Seufer Verlag. 110 pp. . [review in Draco 21: 91].

External links

Takydromus
Reptiles of India
Reptiles described in 1870
Taxa named by Thomas C. Jerdon